Sushi Nakazawa is an upscale Japanese sushi restaurant located on Commerce Street in Manhattan. The restaurant has been praised for its quality and preparation.

Restaurant
The restaurant was opened in 2013 by Maurizio de Rosa and Alessandro Borgognone who hired Jiro Ono's protege Daisuke Nakazawa, after watching David Gelb's documentary, Jiro Dreams of Sushi.

There are only ten seats at the counter and 25 seats in the dining room. In 2016, the restaurant expanded to a space next door, opening a lounge with an a la carte menu.

Expansion
In 2018, Sushi Nakazawa opened a second location in the Old Post Office on Pennsylvania Avenue in Washington, D.C.

Reviews and ratings
In December of its opening year, Pete Wells named Sushi Nakazawa among only six restaurants with a perfect four-star review from the New York Times.

The Michelin Guide awarded a star to Sushi Nakazawa in 2019. The DC location was also awarded a star in 2020.

References

External links
 
 Official website for Washington DC location

Japanese-American culture in New York City
Sushi restaurants in the United States
Restaurants in Manhattan
Restaurants established in 2013
2013 establishments in New York City
Michelin Guide starred restaurants in New York (state)
Japanese restaurants in New York (state)